Summit Point is an unincorporated community in Jefferson County in the U.S. state of West Virginia.

The community is located along the Baltimore and Ohio Railroad at the intersection of West Virginia Secondary Route 1 and Summit Point Pike in the lower Shenandoah Valley. Summit Point is the hometown of MetroNews radio personality Hoppy Kercheval.

References 

Unincorporated communities in Jefferson County, West Virginia
Unincorporated communities in West Virginia